Bengsch is a German surname. Notable people with the surname include:

 Alfred Bengsch (1921–1979), German Cardinal of the Roman Catholic Church
 Hubertus Bengsch (born 1952), German actor
 Robert Bengsch (born 1983), German track cyclist

German-language surnames